Mary Mona Greenwood, married name Mona Bradbury (10 August 1901 – 4 April 1976) was an English cricketer who played as a batter. She appeared in two Test matches for England in 1937, both against Australia. She played domestic cricket for Yorkshire.

References

External links
 
 

1901 births
1976 deaths
Cricketers from Halifax, West Yorkshire
England women Test cricketers
Yorkshire women cricketers